Pluvialis  is a genus of plovers, a group of wading birds comprising four species that breed in the temperate or Arctic Northern Hemisphere.

In breeding plumage, they all have largely black underparts, and golden or silvery upperparts. They have relatively short bills and feed mainly on insects, worms or other invertebrates, depending on habitat, which are obtained by a run-and-pause technique, rather than the steady probing of some other wader groups. They hunt by sight, rather than by feel as do longer-billed waders.

Taxonomy
The genus Pluvialis was introduced by the French zoologist Mathurin Jacques Brisson in 1760 with the European golden plover (Pluvialis apricaria) as the type species. The genus name is Latin and means relating to rain, from pluvia, "rain".  It was believed that they flocked when rain was imminent.

The genus contains four species:

The American and Pacific golden plovers were formerly considered conspecific as "lesser golden plover".

References

 
Bird genera